In mathematics, a content is a set function that is like a measure, but a content must only be finitely additive, whereas a measure must be countably additive. A content is a real function  defined on a collection of subsets  such that
 
 
 

For this reason some authors prefer to define contents only for the case of semirings or even rings.

If a content is additionally σ-additive it is called a pre-measure and if furthermore  is a σ-algebra, the content is called a measure. Therefore every (real-valued) measure is a content, but not vice versa. Contents give a good notion of integrating bounded functions on a space but can behave badly when integrating unbounded functions, while measures give a good notion of integrating unbounded functions.

Examples

A classical example is to define a content on all half open intervals  by setting their content to the length of the intervals, that is,  One can further show that this content is actually σ-additive and thus defines a pre-measure on the semiring of all half-open intervals. This can be used to construct the Lebesgue measure for the real number line using Carathéodory's extension theorem. For further details on the general construction see article on Lebesgue measure.

An example of a content that is not a measure on a σ-algebra is the content on all subsets of the positive integers that has value  on any integer  and is infinite on any infinite subset.

An example of a content on the positive integers that is always finite but is not a measure can be given as follows. Take a positive linear functional on the bounded sequences that is 0 if the sequence has only a finite number of nonzero elements and takes value 1 on the sequence  so the functional in some sense gives an "average value" of any bounded sequence. (Such a functional cannot be constructed explicitly, but exists by the Hahn–Banach theorem.) Then the content of a set of positive integers is the average value of the sequence that is 1 on this set and 0 elsewhere. Informally, one can think  of the content of a subset of integers as the "chance" that a randomly chosen integer lies in this subset (though this is not compatible with the usual definitions of chance in probability theory, which assume countable additivity).

Properties

Frequently contents are defined on collections of sets that satisfy further constraints. In this case additional properties can be deduced that fail to hold in general for contents defined on any collections of sets.

On semirings 

If  forms a Semiring of sets then the following statements can be deduced:
 Every content  is monotone that is, 
 Every content  is subadditive that is, 
 for  such that

On rings 

If furthermore  is a Ring of sets one gets additionally:
 Subtractivity: for  satisfying  it follows 
 
 Subadditivity: 
 -Superadditivity: For any  pairwise disjoint satisfying  we have 
 If  is a finite content, that is,  then the inclusion–exclusion principle applies:  where  for all

Integration of bounded functions

In general integration of functions with respect to a content does not behave well. However there is a well-behaved notion of integration provided that the function is bounded and the total content of the space is finite, given as follows.

Suppose that the total content of a space is finite. 

Duals of spaces of bounded functions

Suppose that  is a measure on some space  The bounded measurable functions on  form a Banach space with respect to the supremum norm.

Construction of a measure from a content

There are several ways to construct a measure μ from a content  on a topological space. This section gives one such method for locally compact Hausdorff spaces such that the content is defined on all compact subsets. In general the measure is not an extension of the content, as the content may fail to be countably additive, and the measure may even be identically zero even if the content is not.

First restrict the content to compact sets. This gives a function  of compact sets  with the following properties:
  for all compact sets 
 
 
  for all pairs of compact sets
  for all pairs of disjoint compact sets.

There are also examples of functions  as above not constructed from contents. 
An example is given by the construction of Haar measure on a locally compact group. One method of constructing such a Haar measure is to produce a left-invariant function  as above on the compact subsets of the group, which can then be extended to a left-invariant measure.

Definition on open sets

Given λ as above, we define a function μ on all open sets by 

This has the following properties: 
 
 
 
  for any collection of open sets
  for any collection of disjoint open sets.

Definition on all sets

Given μ as above, we extend the  function μ to all subsets of the topological space by 

This is an outer measure, in other words it has the following properties: 
 
 
 
  for any countable collection of sets.

Construction of a measure

The function μ above is an outer measure on the family of all subsets. Therefore it becomes a measure when restricted to the measurable subsets for the outer measure, which are the subsets  such that  for all subsets  If the space is locally compact then every open set is measurable for this measure.

The measure  does not necessarily coincide with the content  on compact sets, However it does if  is regular in the sense that 

See also

References

 
 
 

Measure theory
Families of sets